A Very New Found Glory Christmas is the third EP by American rock band New Found Glory. Self-produced by the band, it is a special edition Christmas-themed acoustic recording featuring two original songs and three covers. The EP was limited to 2,000 pressings and was released via cassette tape on December 1, 2012. 1,000 white copies were sold on tour, and 1,000 red copies were sold in their online store. The band released "Nothing for Christmas" via Rdio and Spotify on December 20, after debuting songs off the EP during the tenth anniversary tour of their Sticks and Stones album. The cover art is a parody of the 1990 blockbuster movie Home Alone.

Track listing

Personnel
New Found Glory
Chad Gilbert – lead guitar, backing vocals, producer
Jordan Pundik – lead vocals, producer
Steve Klein – rhythm guitar, backing vocals, producer
Ian Grushka - bass guitar, backing vocals
Cyrus Bolooki - tambourine, drums, percussion, backing vocals

References

2012 EPs
New Found Glory EPs
Albums produced by Chad Gilbert
2012 Christmas albums
Christmas albums by American artists
Self-released EPs
Christmas EPs